Food Wars may refer to:

Food Wars (American TV series), television program on the Travel Channel
 Food Wars!: Shokugeki no Soma, a Japanese manga written by Yūto Tsukuda and illustrated by Shun Saeki, also made into an anime series.
The Food Wars, a 2009 book by Walden Bello

See also
 Food Battle (disambiguation)
 Food fight (disambiguation)
 Food riot